Harris was an American rock band formed in Lowell, Massachusetts in 2000. The group independently released one studio album, The Light Is Seeping Through the Cracks, along with numerous EPs, before disbanding in April 2009.

History
Harris was formed by vocalist/bassist Mike Nastri and guitarist Matt Scott in 2000 while they attended UMass Lowell. After releasing several EPs, Harris independently recorded, produced, and released their only full-length album, The Light Is Seeping Through the Cracks, in 2005. The album's release was followed by a self-booked tour of the United States and Canada, which was met with mixed reviews. Harris toured Europe in the summer of 2008, and amicably disbanded in April 2009 due to the members' increasing family and career obligations. Their final recording, Snake Says Woof, was released on April 18, 2009 at their last show, which took place at the legendary Middle East Downstairs nightclub in Cambridge, Massachusetts.

Music
Harris's music was rooted in rock but was made up of diverse styles, with influences such as The Police. The Boston Herald described the band's music as a dynamic mix of "smooth sounds and harsher, heavier clashes". "We try to mix as many genres as we possibly can and try to come out with a coherent, original sound," drummer Rob Lynch described. Harris had a shared writing process among its five members, who would switch instruments in order to share ideas. Harris frequently played in the Boston area, and was described by Northeast Performer as a "comforting presence in local rock."

Members
 Rob Blatt – drums (2000–2002)
 Jon Day – guitar (2002–2009)
 Rob Lynch – drums, percussion (2002–2009)
 Mike Nastri – vocals, bass (2000–2009)
 Jim Reed – keyboard, vocals (2003–2009)
 Matt Scott – guitar (2000–2009)
 Mike Seluk – guitar (2000–2002)
 Andrew Sutherland – keyboard (2000–2003)

Discography

Studio albums
 The First Few Year (2001)
 New Morning Pulse (2003)
 The Light Is Seeping Through the Cracks (2005)
 Tales from the Split, Vol. 1 (2007 - DV's records) (Split LP with the French band Spudgun)
 Snake Says Woof (2009 - DV's records)

EPs
 The Early Year (2000)
 Live: Long Beach Arena, March 7, 1987 (2001)
 The Hottastic Sessions (2002)
 New Morning Pulse (Urinine, 2003)

References

Additional references

 Barker, J. David (October 14, 2005). "Review: Harris, The Light Is Seeping Through the Cracks." Silent Uproar.
 Carradini, Stephen (October 1, 2005). "Review: Harris, The Light Is Seeping Through the Cracks." Independent Clauses.
 Del Costello, Philip (March 1, 2004). "Review: Harris, New Morning Pulse." Indie Workshop.
 Gisselbrecht, Steve (June 2004). "Live review: April 24, 2004." The Noise.
 Gisselbrecht, Steve (July/August 2004). "Live review: June 16, 2004." The Noise.
 Gisselbrecht, Steve (October 2004). "Live review: September 2, 2004." The Noise.
 Gisselbrecht, Steve (May 2005). "Live review: April 10, 2005." The Noise.
 Gisselbrecht, Steve (October 2005). "Live review: June 23, 2005." The Noise.
 Gisselbrecht, Steve (November 2005). "Live review: October 14, 2005." The Noise.
 Glenwood (November 2005). "Review: Harris, The Light Is Seeping Through the Cracks." The Noise.
 Mathews, Kevin (Spring–Summer 2006). "Review: Harris, The Light Is Seeping Through the Cracks." Pop Culture Press.
 Nolan, Jon (October 26, 2005). "Live review: October 18, 2005." The Wire.
 Sleepy Eddie (June 2004). "Live review: April 24, 2004." The Noise.

External links
 Harris (official site)
 Harris (MySpace)

Rock music groups from Massachusetts
Musical groups established in 2000
Musical groups disestablished in 2009